= William Blyth Gerish =

William Blyth Gerish (1864–1921) was an English antiquarian, biographer and folklorist from Hertfordshire.
